West Bay Shore is a hamlet and census-designated place (CDP) in the Town of Islip, Suffolk County, New York, United States. Its population was 4,648 at the 2010 census.

History
Sagtikos Manor is one of the oldest structures in the Town of Islip. The original structure, which was later expanded, was built in 1697 by New York City's first native-born mayor, Stephanus Van Cortlandt. The manor functioned for a time, during the American Revolution, as local headquarters for British forces under General Sir Henry Clinton. George Washington used it as a stopover during a 1790 tour of Long Island. It was added to the National Register of Historic Places in 1976.

Geography

Demographics

Demographics of the CDP
As of the census of 2000, there were 4,775 people, 1,721 households, and 1,366 families residing in the CDP. The population density was 1,996.9 per square mile (771.4/km2). There were 1,789 housing units at an average density of 748.2/sq mi (289.0/km2). The racial makeup of the CDP was 94.62% White, 0.94% African American, 0.17% Native American, 2.20% Asian, 0.92% from other races, and 1.15% from two or more races. Hispanic or Latino of any race were 4.08% of the population.

There were 1,721 households, out of which 30.6% had children under the age of 18 living with them, 67.3% were married couples living together, 9.6% had a female householder with no husband present, and 20.6% were non-families. 16.5% of all households were made up of individuals, and 7.9% had someone living alone who was 65 years of age or older. The average household size was 2.76 and the average family size was 3.11.

In the CDP, the population was spread out, with 23.3% under the age of 18, 5.8% from 18 to 24, 27.0% from 25 to 44, 26.6% from 45 to 64, and 17.3% who were 65 years of age or older. The median age was 42 years. For every 100 females, there were 94.8 males. For every 100 females age 18 and over, there were 91.2 males.

The median income for a household in the CDP was $73,194, and the median income for a family was $75,055. Males had a median income of $61,635 versus $41,667 for females. The per capita income for the CDP was $31,998. About 3.1% of families and 4.6% of the population were below the poverty line, including 2.5% of those under age 18 and 6.4% of those age 65 or over.

References

Islip (town), New York
Census-designated places in New York (state)
Census-designated places in Suffolk County, New York
Populated coastal places in New York (state)